Events from the year 1994 in Canada.

Incumbents

Crown 
 Monarch – Elizabeth II

Federal government 
 Governor General – Ray Hnatyshyn 
 Prime Minister – Jean Chrétien
 Chief Justice – Antonio Lamer (Quebec) 
 Parliament – 35th (from January 14)

Provincial governments

Lieutenant governors 
Lieutenant Governor of Alberta – Gordon Towers  
Lieutenant Governor of British Columbia – David Lam
Lieutenant Governor of Manitoba – Yvon Dumont
Lieutenant Governor of New Brunswick – Gilbert Finn (until June 21) then Margaret McCain 
Lieutenant Governor of Newfoundland – Frederick Russell 
Lieutenant Governor of Nova Scotia – Lloyd Crouse (until June 23) then James Kinley 
Lieutenant Governor of Ontario – Hal Jackman 
Lieutenant Governor of Prince Edward Island – Marion Reid 
Lieutenant Governor of Quebec – Martial Asselin 
Lieutenant Governor of Saskatchewan – Sylvia Fedoruk (until May 31) then Jack Wiebe

Premiers 
Premier of Alberta – Ralph Klein 
Premier of British Columbia – Mike Harcourt 
Premier of Manitoba – Gary Filmon 
Premier of New Brunswick – Frank McKenna 
Premier of Newfoundland – Clyde Wells 
Premier of Nova Scotia – John Savage 
Premier of Ontario – Bob Rae 
Premier of Prince Edward Island – Catherine Callbeck 
Premier of Quebec – Robert Bourassa (until January 11) then Daniel Johnson, Jr. (January 11 to September 26) then Jacques Parizeau 
Premier of Saskatchewan – Roy Romanow

Territorial governments

Commissioners 
 Commissioner of Yukon –  John Kenneth McKinnon 
 Commissioner of Northwest Territories – Daniel L. Norris

Premiers 
Premier of the Northwest Territories – Nellie Cournoyea
Premier of Yukon – John Ostashek

Events

January to June
Winter – One of the coldest winters on record affects much of Canada.
January 1 – North American Free Trade Agreement (NAFTA) goes into effect.
January 11 – Daniel Johnson, Jr., becomes premier of Quebec, replacing Robert Bourassa.
February – The first Liberal budget slashes spending in an effort to cut the deficit. Unemployment Insurance and provincial transfer payments are especially hard hit.
March 21 – A civilian inquiry in the behaviour of the Canadian Airborne in Somalia is launched.
April 5 – The Just Desserts shooting occurs in Toronto,
May 10 annular solar eclipse happened in Ontario, Quebec and the Maritimes  
June – An Ontario farmer is allowed to grow  of marijuana for research purposes,
June 9 – Ontario's Equality Rights Statute Amendment Act (Bill 167), a bill proposed by the government of Bob Rae to extend civil union rights to same-sex couples, is defeated on a vote of 68–59 in the Legislative Assembly of Ontario.

July to December
September 12 – Quebec election, the Parti Québécois defeats the Parti libéral du Québec, which had been in power for nine years.
September 26 – Jacques Parizeau (Parti Québécois) is sworn in as premier of Quebec, replacing Daniel Johnson, Jr.
October 5 and October 6 – Members of the Solar Temple cult commit mass suicide.
December – Lucien Bouchard is infected with necrotizing fasciitis and loses a leg.

Full date unknown
Conrad Black's company buys the Chicago Sun-Times.
Bertram Brockhouse shares the Nobel Prize in Physics.
Cigarette taxes are slashed to battle smuggling and black market organizations.
Canadian troops leave CFB Lahr, ending the Canadian armed forces presence in Europe.
The Alberta Court of Appeal strikes down a lower court ruling that homosexual persons are to be covered under the province's human rights legislation. The case, originally brought by Delwin Vriend, was subsequently appealed to the Supreme Court of Canada.
American hardware retail chain, Home Depot buys the Aikenhead's Hardware chain.

Arts and literature

New works
Margaret Atwood: Good Bones and Simple Murders
Robert J. Sawyer: Foreigner
William Bell: Five Days of the Ghost
Michael Ignatieff: Blood and Belonging: Journeys into the New Nationalism
Réjean Ducharme: Va savoir
Mordecai Richler: This Year in Jerusalem
Dave Duncan: The Living God
Hank Snow: Just a Hank Snow Story
Alice Munro: Open Secrets
Douglas Coupland: Life After God
Farley Mowat: Born Naked

Awards

Giller Prize: M.G. Vassanji: The Book of Secrets
Books in Canada First Novel Award: Deborah Joy Corey, Losing Eddie: A Novel
Geoffrey Bilson Award: Kit Pearson, The Lights Go On Again
Gerald Lampert Award: Barbara Klar, The Night You Called Me a Shadow and Illya Tourtidis, Mad Magellan's Tale
Marian Engel Award: Jane Urquhart
Pat Lowther Award: Diana Brebner, The Golden Lotus
Stephen Leacock Award: Bill Richardson, Bachelor Brother's Bed and Breakfast
Trillium Book Award English: Donald Haram Akenson, Conor: A Biography of Conor Cruise O'Brien; Volume 1 Narrative,
Trillium Book Award French: Andrée Lacelle, Tant de vie s'égare
Vicky Metcalf Award: Welwyn Wilton Katz

Television
The Kids in the Hall ends

Films

Atom Egoyan's Exotica is released

Sport
February 14  – The Vancouver Grizzlies are established as the NBA's second Canadian team. They started play in 1995 
February 27 – The 1994 Winter Olympics end in Lillehammer, Norway.
May 14 – The Kamloops Blazers win their second Memorial Cup by defeating the Laval Titan 5 to 3. The entire tournament took place at Colisée de Laval in Laval, Quebec
June 14 – New York Rangers win their fourth (and first since 1940) Stanley Cup by defeating the Vancouver Canucks 4 games to 2. 
July 6 – 3 more American teams (Las Vegas Posse, the Shreveport Pirates and the Baltimore Stallions) are established in the Canadian Football League
August 18–28 – 1994 Commonwealth Games in Victoria, British Columbia
October – A lockout closes the National Hockey League for the entire first half of the season.
November 19 – The Western Ontario Mustangs win their sixth Vanier Cup by defeating the Saskatchewan Huskies 50–40 in the 30th Vanier Cup played at Skydome in Toronto
November 27 – The BC Lions win their third Grey Cup by defeating the Baltimore Stallions 26 to 23 in the 82nd Grey Cup played at BC Place Stadium in Vancouver. Vancouver's own Lui Passaglia is awarded the game's Most Valuable Canadian
Ice hockey is made Canada's official winter sport. Lacrosse is named official summer sport.

Births
February 8 – Nikki Yanofsky born in Hampstead, Quebec
February 16 – Matthew Knight, actor
February 19 – Jean-Carl Boucher born in Regina, Saskatchewan
February 25 – Eugenie Bouchard born in Westmount, Quebec
March 1 – Justin Bieber born in London, Ontario
March 5 – Aislinn Paul, actress
March 13 – Andrea Macasaet born in Winnipeg, Manitoba
March 25
Keffals, transgender activist
Keven Aleman, Costa Rican-born soccer player
April 17 – Alanna Goldie, fencer
April 19 – Maddison Bird born in Scarborough, Ontario
May 1 – Antoine Bibeau, ice hockey player
June 2 – Shroud, Canadian streamer
July 17 – Jessica Amlee, actress
July 27 – Winnie Harlow, fashion model
August 25 – Paul-André Brasseur, actor
September 8 – Élie Dupuis, actor
October 2 – Brendan Meyer, actor
October 9 – Jodelle Ferland born in Nanaimo, British Columbia
November 11 – Connor Price born in Toronto, Ontario
December 23 – Tianda Flegel

Full date unknown
Sean Collins, son of politician Chris Collins (died 2007)

Deaths
February 12 – Sue Rodriguez, advocate for assisted suicide (born 1950)
March 4 – John Candy, comedian and actor (born 1950)
April 17 – Robert Legget, civil engineer, historian and non-fiction writer (born 1904)
June 17 – Helen Battle, first Canadian woman PhD in marine biology (born 1903)
July 1 – Michael Cook, playwright (born 1933)
August – Wally Downer, politician (born 1904)
October 12 – Gérald Godin, poet and politician (born 1938)
December 10 – Alex Wilson, track and field athlete and Olympic silver medalist (born 1905)
December 20 – John Wintermeyer, politician (born 1916)

Full date unknown
Arthur Julian Andrew, diplomat and author (born 1915)
Felix Partz, artist and co-founder of the artistic collective General Idea (born 1945)
Jorge Zontal, artist and co-founder of the artistic collective General Idea (born 1944)
Gordon Sparling, filmmaker (born 1900)

See also

 1994 in Canadian television
 List of Canadian films of 1994

References

 
Years of the 20th century in Canada
Canada
1994 in North America